The Rural Municipality of Connaught No. 457 is a rural municipality (RM) in the Canadian province of Saskatchewan within Census Division No. 14 and  Division No. 4.

History 
The RM of Connaught No. 457 incorporated as a rural municipality on December 11, 1911. It was previously Local Improvement District No. 457.

Geography

Communities and localities 
The following urban municipalities are surrounded by the RM.

Villages
Ridgedale

Demographics 

Government 
The RM of Connaught No. 457 is governed by an elected municipal council and an appointed administrator that meets on the second Wednesday of every month. The reeve of the RM is Arthur Lalonde while its administrator is Jaime Orr. The RM's office is located in Tisdale.

References 

C